Cohors [prima] Antiochensium [quingenaria] equitata ("[1st] part-mounted [500 strong] cohort of Antiochenses") was a Roman auxiliary regiment containing cavalry contingents. The cohort stationed in Dacia at castra Drobeta.

References
 Academia Română: Istoria Românilor, Vol. 2, Daco-romani, romanici, alogeni, 2nd. Ed., București, 2010,

See also 
 Roman auxiliaries
 List of Roman auxiliary regiments

Military of ancient Rome
Auxiliary equitata units of ancient Rome
Roman Dacia